Unrestricted Warfare: Two Air Force Senior Colonels on Scenarios for War and the Operational Art in an Era of Globalization is a book on military strategy written in 1999 by two colonels in the People's Liberation Army (PLA), Qiao Liang (乔良) and Wang Xiangsui (王湘穗). Its primary concern is how a nation such as China can defeat a technologically superior opponent (such as the United States) through a variety of means. Rather than focusing on direct military confrontation, this book instead examines a variety of other means such as political warfare. Such means include using legal tools (see lawfare) and economic means as leverage over one's opponent and circumvent the need for direct military action.

Etymology
Taylor Fravel pointed out a common distortion in translation of the subtitle of the book. While it was translated and understood in the West by many as "China’s Master Plan to Destroy America", the actual subtitle was "Two Air Force Senior Colonels on Scenarios for War and the Operational Art in an Era of Globalization".

Source of text
The English translation of the book was made available by the Foreign Broadcast Information Service in 1999. The book was then published in English by a previously unknown Panamanian publisher, with the subtitle "China's Master Plan to Destroy America" and a picture of the burning World Trade Center on the cover. A French translation was published in 2003.

The text has been cited by the US government, e.g. on a military website by James Perry who states:
In February 1999, the PLA Literature and Arts Publishing House issued Unrestricted Warfare, a book written by two PLA air force political officers, Senior Col Qiao Liang and Senior Col Wang Xiangsui. The venue for publication and the laudatory reviews of the book in official publications suggested that Unrestricted Warfare enjoyed the support of some elements of the PLA leadership. The Western press quoted various sensational passages from the book and described it in terms that verged on hyperbole. The book was not a blueprint for a “dirty war” against the West but a call for innovative thinking on future warfare.

Weaknesses of the United States
The book argues that the primary weakness of the United States in military matters is that the US views revolution in military thought solely in terms of technology. The book further argues that to the US, military doctrine evolves because new technology allows new capabilities. As such, the book argues that the United States does not consider the wider picture of military strategy, which includes legal and economic factors. The book proceeds to argue that the United States is vulnerable to attacks along these lines.

Alternative methods of attack
Reducing one's opponent, the book notes, can be accomplished in a number of ways other than direct military confrontation. The book notes that these alternative methods "have the same and even greater destructive force than military warfare, and they have already produced serious threats different from the past and in many directions for...national security."

Defense against unrestricted warfare

The authors note that an old-fashioned mentality that considers military action the only offensive action is inadequate given the new range of threats. Instead, the authors advocate forming a "composite force in all aspects related to national interest. Moreover, given this type of composite force, it is also necessary to have this type of composite force to become the means which can be utilized for actual operations. This should be a "grand warfare method" which combines all of the dimensions and methods in the two major areas of military and non-military affairs so as to carry out warfare. This is opposite of the formula for warfare methods brought forth in past wars."

Implications
As the authors state, the new range of options combined with the rising cost (both political and financial) of waging traditional warfare results in the rising dominance of the new alternatives to traditional military action. A state that does not heed these warnings is in dire shape.

In popular culture
The novels Foreign Influence, Full Black, and Act of War by Brad Thor are based on this book. 

Unrestricted Warfare is heavily referenced in the non-fiction 2019 book Stealth War: How China Took Over While America's Elite Slept.

See also 

 Assassin's Mace
Chinese information operations and information warfare
United Front Work Department
Thirty-Six Stratagems

References

External links

 Full text of Unrestricted Warfare

1999 non-fiction books
Chinese-language books
International law literature
Military strategy books
People's Liberation Army
Chinese information operations and information warfare
Warfare by type